Falling on a grenade is the deliberate act of using one's body to cover a live time-fused hand grenade, absorbing the explosion and fragmentation in an effort to save the lives of others nearby. Since this is almost universally fatal, it is considered an especially conspicuous and selfless act of individual sacrifice in wartime; in United States military history, more citations for the Medal of Honor, the country's highest military decoration, have been awarded for falling on grenades to save comrades than any other single act.

Such an act can be survivable: in World War II, U.S. Marine Jack Lucas, in the Battle of Iwo Jima, put his steel M1 helmet over two grenades and laid on top of it before the grenades exploded. Lucas lived, but spent the rest of his life with over 200 pieces of shrapnel in his body. In 2008 near Sangin in Afghanistan, British Royal Marine Matthew Croucher used his rucksack to pin a tripwire grenade to the floor; his body armor absorbed the majority of the blast. On November 21, 2010 in Marjah, Helmand Province, Afghanistan in support of Operation Enduring Freedom, U.S. Marine Lance Corporal Kyle Carpenter threw himself upon a grenade, thrown onto a rooftop, to save a fellow Marine, sustaining injuries to his face and right arm and losing his right eye; he survived these wounds. Despite these rare instances, however, the odds of survival are extremely slim. With modern medicine, however, odds are greatly increased when compared to falling on a grenade in the 20th century.

In World War I British soldier John Carmichael was awarded the Victoria Cross for saving his men by putting his steel helmet over a grenade and then standing on the helmet to reduce the blast damage. Carmichael survived although it was several years before he recovered sufficiently to be discharged from hospital.

See also
Altruistic suicide
Human shield
William McFadzean
John Robert Osborn
Roi Klein
Nathan Elbaz

References

Grenades
Suicide methods
Altruism